Abubakar Abdul Rahim (7 February 1920 – 31 August 1995) was an Indian politician, freedom fighter, and union minister. He was born to Sri Abubecker in Kollam. The government run District Hospital of Kollam district was renamed after him in commemoration.

Early life and education
A. A. Rahim was born on February 7, 1920, in Chirayinkil village in Travancore state, as the son of Shri Abubeker Kunju. He completed his primary education from Govt. English school, Quilon. After completing, he went to St. Berchman's college Chanaganassery. Subsequently, he earned a degree from Mohammadans college Madras and after University college Trivandrum.
He was a Social and political activist in his early life.

Political career
He came through the Student Movement of the Indian National Congress. He became the President of the District Congress Committee of Kollam, and also held position viz. KPCC Executive Member, AICC Member. He held portfolios like Industries, Health, Agriculture in the Panampilli Govinda Menon's Travancore Cochin State Ministry in 1954. He was elected to the Kerala Legislative Assembly in 1957, '60, '65, '70, '77. In 1965 he was elected to the legislative assembly but no single party could form a ministry commanding majority and hence this election is considered abortive. On March 25, President's rule was invoked for the fourth time. In 1980 he was elected to the Loksabha from Chirayinkil Constituency and served as the Union Minister of State for External Affairs, Justice, Law and company affairs in the Third Indira Gandhi Ministry from 1982-84. In 1989–90 he also served as the Governor of Meghalaya.

Other positions held
 KPCC Vice President
 President Quilon DCC
 Member, AICC
 Member, Governing Council, Indian Institute of Technology, Madras
 Chairman, Iqbal Arts College, Trivandrum
 Member, Cochin University Senate
 Chairman, Governing Council, Thangal Kunju Musliar Engineering College, Quilon
 Chairman, Malikdhinar Educational Trust, Quilon
 Member, Central Wakf Board
 Director, Hindustan Insecticides
 Board Member, United Electricals and Allied Industries, Khadi and Village Industries
 Deputy Leader, Kerala Legislative Assembly
 Chairman, Public Accounts Committee, Committee on Subordinate Legislation, Estimates Committee and several other legislative committees.
 Member, Committee of Privileges.
 Managing Editor, Prabhatham Daily

See also
 Vayalar Ravi
 T. K. Divakaran
 Ram Niwas Mirdha

References

External links
He was union minister in the cabinet.

Indian National Congress politicians from Kerala
1920 births
1995 deaths
Governors of Meghalaya
People from Kollam
Politicians from Kollam
India MPs 1980–1984
20th-century Indian Muslims
Lok Sabha members from Kerala
Indian independence activists from Kerala
People from Kollam district
Kerala MLAs 1957–1959
Kerala MLAs 1960–1964
Kerala MLAs 1970–1977
Kerala MLAs 1977–1979